Habemus Capa is the third studio album by the Italian rapper Caparezza, released on May 24, 2006. The album title and the final track of the same name are a play on the traditional Latin phrase "Habemus Papa" (more properly Habemus Papam) used to announce the selection of a new Pope.

The idea for the album comes from the idea that Caparezza hypothetically dies, like in the last track of the previous album, but, as he "dies" while he is still alive, he can gain from the success of the album.

Track listing 
 "Mors mea tacci tua" – 0:26
 "Annunciatemi al pubblico" – 4:07
 "Torna Catalessi" – 3:57
 "Gli insetti del podere" – 3:58
 "Dalla parte del toro" – 3:58
 "Ninna nanna di Mazzarò" – 4:41
 "Il silenzio dei colpevoli" – 4:08
 "Profilo psichico" – 0:35
 "La mia parte intollerante" – 4:22
 "Inno verdano" – 3:49
 "Epocalisse" – 3:54
 "Tii-yan" – 0:24
 "The Auditels Family" – 4:07
 "Ti giri" – 3:41
 "Titoli" – 3:55
 "Felici ma trimoni" – 4:53
 "Sssaasss" – 0:22
 "Sono troppo stitico" – 3:58
 "Habemus Capa" – 4:24

Certifications

References

2006 albums
Caparezza albums